Walter Kerr Hamilton (16 November 1808 – 1 August 1869) was a Church of England priest, Bishop of Salisbury from 1854 until his death.

Life
He was born in 1808, educated at Eton College, tutored by Thomas Arnold, and then attended Christ Church, University of Oxford, where he took a first class degree in Greats. He was elected to a Fellowship at Merton College, Oxford in 1832. He was made deacon in 1833 and ordained priest in December of the same year. He was a curate at Wolvercote 1833–34, then served as curate to Edward Denison, another Fellow at Merton and vicar at the parish of St Peter-in-the-East. Upon Denison's appointment as Bishop of Salisbury in 1837, Hamilton succeeded him as vicar, remaining until 1841. He subsequently became a canon-resident of Salisbury.

Upon Denison's death 1854, Hamilton succeeded him as Bishop. In 1860 he founded Salisbury Theological College (now Sarum College).

His private papers are currently in the possession of the Archives of Pusey House, Oxford.

Family
Hamilton was born into an ecclesiastical family, the son of Anthony Hamilton (Archdeacon of Taunton), the nephew of William Richard Hamilton, and the grandson of Anthony Hamilton (Archdeacon of Colchester) and his wife Anne Terrick, daughter of Richard Terrick (Bishop of London).

Hamilton married Isabel Elizabeth Lear on 9 January 1845. His daughter, Eleanor Frances Hamilton, married Dr. Ernest Kingscote (b. 9 Sep 1856, d. 16 Jun 1934) in 1887.

References

External links

1808 births
1869 deaths
Alumni of Christ Church, Oxford
Bishops of Salisbury
Fellows of Merton College, Oxford
People educated at Eton College